KIRAMEK (株式会社キラメック Kiramek, Inc.) is an electronics manufacturing company based in central Japan, recognized for their car alarms and motorcycle security systems that don't false trigger. The company also manufactures LED anti-theft lighting devices as well as other security systems and sensors on an OEM contract basis.

Founded in 2001, headquartered in Handa City in the vicinity of Nagoya, the company assembles products in Japan, Taiwan and China.  Within Japan, products are distributed by the TMY Corporation (辰巳屋興業 Tatsumiya Kogyou) in cooperation with retail partners such as AutoBacs, AutoWave and Yellow Hat.  The company exports select products worldwide.

External links
Official Site(Japanese)
Official Site(English)
VISION Security Site(English)
CYCLONE Motorcycle Security Site(English)
TMY Corporation Site(Japanese & English)

Electronics companies of Japan
Companies based in Aichi Prefecture
Companies established in 2001
Japanese brands